Eino Kettunen (May 13, 1894 - August 15, 1964) was a Finnish composer and lyricist. His most popular piece, Ievan Polkka, was popularized when a website named leekspin.com was created. The site shows an endless flash animation loop (from the anime series Bleach) of Orihime Inoue spinning a leek while singing the song.

The best-known lyrics
 Ilta Viipurissa (Sellanen on Viipuri), 1929 (Saukin uudistama nimellä Sellanen ol´ Viipuri)
 Villiruusu, 1929
 Ievan Polkka, 1937
 Joensuun Elli, 1953

References

Sources
 Elinaikoja
 Kauko Ratilainen ja Eila Ratilainen: Eino Kettusen ikkuna maailmaan. Sotkamo 1996.
 Kauko Ratilainen ja Eila Ratilainen: Eino Kettusen ikkuna maailmaan II.

External links
 Eino Kettusen sävellystuotanto Suomen äänitearkistossa  
 Eino Kettusen sanoitustuotanto Suomen äänitearkistossa 
 YLE Elävä arkisto: Loituma esittää Eino Kettusen kappaleen Ievan polkka

1894 births
1964 deaths
People from Juuka
People from Kuopio Province (Grand Duchy of Finland)
Finnish composers
Finnish male composers
20th-century male musicians